Adam de Hertyngdon (also Hartington or Hertington)  (d. 1380) was Archdeacon of London from 1362 to 1368 and a Canon of Windsor from 1368-1379.

Career

He was ordained sub-deacon at Chelmsford in the diocese of Winchester by Simon Sudbury on 24 September 1362.

He was appointed:
Prebendary of Hastings 1362
Archdeacon of London 1362 - 1368
Clerk of the Works at Windsor 1365
Warwick Chamberlain in the Exchequer 1369 - 1376
Prebendary of Willesden in St Paul’s Cathedral 1375
Prebendary of Wells Cathedral
Prebendary of Exeter Cathedral
Prebendary of Netherbury in Ecclesia in Salisbury Cathedral 1377
Prebendary of Romsey Abbey
Dean of Stafford 1376

He was appointed to the eighth stall in St George's Chapel, Windsor Castle in 1368 but hold held it for 5 months, when he swapped it for the second stall. He resigned in 1376 but was reappointed later in the same year.

Notes 

1380 deaths
Canons of Windsor
Archdeacons of London
Year of birth missing